Blood & Stone is the thirteenth studio album by American rock band Sevendust. It was released on October 23, 2020. Two songs were showcased from the album ahead of its full release; the first single, a tribute to the late singer Chris Cornell of Soundgarden, "The Day I Tried to Live", along with one other promotional song and single, "Blood from a Stone".

Writing and recording
The band starting writing and recording the album shortly after the "All I See Is War" tour in 2019. The band had chosen to work with music producer Michael "Elvis" Baskette on the album, which marks his second collaboration with the band.

Themes and composition
The title track "Blood from a Stone" is about the endurance and threshold of the band, the wins and the losses, and the good years and bad years from the band. It was also described to be brooding and dark with surging rhythms, slightly off-key melodies, and very strong drumming by Morgan Rose.

Track listing

Personnel

Sevendust
Lajon Witherspoon – lead vocals
Clint Lowery – lead guitar, backing vocals, co-lead vocals on "Love" and “Blood from a Stone”
John Connolly – rhythm guitar, backing vocals
Vinnie Hornsby – bass, backing vocals
Morgan Rose – drums, backing vocals

Production and design
Michael "Elvis" Baskette – production, mixing
Brad Blackwood − mastering
Ryan Clark − designer
Jeff Moll − digital editor, engineer
Josh Saldate − assistant engineer
Jeremiah Scott − photographer

Charts

References

2020 albums
Sevendust albums
Rise Records albums
Albums produced by Michael Baskette